The Isaac and Tamara Deutscher Memorial Prize is an annual prize given in honour of historian Isaac Deutscher and his wife Tamara Deutscher for a new book published in English "which exemplifies the best and most innovative new writing in or about the Marxist tradition." It has been ongoing since 1969.

As of November 2021, members of the Deutscher Jury include Gilbert Achcar, Alex Callinicos, Alejandro Colas, Ben Fine, Rob Knox, Esther Leslie, Alfredo Saad-Filho, Chris Wickham, and Lea Ypi.

Recipients include Jairus Banaji (2011, Theory as History: Essays on Modes of Production and Exploitation), David Harvey (2010, The Enigma of Capital and the Crises of Capitalism), Rick Kuhn (2007, for a biography of Henryk Grossman), Christopher Wickham (2006, for Framing the Early Middle Ages), Francis Wheen (1999, for a biography of Karl Marx), Eric Hobsbawm (1995, for The Age of Extremes), Terry Eagleton (1989, The Ideology of the Aesthetic), Robert Brenner (1985, for The Brenner Debate), and G. A. Cohen (1978, for Karl Marx's Theory of History: A Defence).

Winning authors may contribute to the Deutscher Memorial Lecture series the following year; the lecture, or a text based upon it, is published in a variety of outlets, including Historical Materialism, the New Left Review, International Socialism, and the International Socialist Review.

Recipients 
Shortlists for each year can be found on the Deutscher Prize website.

Reference

External links
The Deutscher Prize website

1969 establishments in the United Kingdom
Awards established in 1969
British literary awards
Marxism
Political book awards